The Lichen Hills are an escarpment-like range of hills located  south of the Caudal Hills on the west margin of upper Rennick Glacier, in Victoria Land, Antarctica. Its north end forms Section Peak.
Lichens were collected there, hence the name given by the northern party of the New Zealand Geological Survey Antarctic Expedition, 1962–63.

References

Hills of Victoria Land
Pennell Coast